The Maya Block, also known as the Maya Terrane, Yucatan Block, or YucatanChiapas Block, is a physiographic or geomorphic region and tectonic or crustal block in the southernmost portion of the North American Plate.

Extent 
The Block is commonly delimited by the continental margin in the Gulf of Mexico to the north, in the Caribbean Sea to the east, and in the Pacific Ocean to the southwest, and further, by the MotaguaPolochic Faults to the south-southeast, and by the Isthmus of Tehuantepec to the west. The MotaguaPolochic Faults divide the Maya Block from the Chortis Block, while the Isthmus of Tehuantepec divides it from the Oaxaquia Block (ie the Juarez, Cuicateco, or Oaxaquia Block, Terrane, or microcontinent).

The Block's precise subaerial limits are not widely agreed upon, in contrast to its relatively exact submarine borders. Furthermore, it has been recently suggested that the Block's western extreme may rather extend past the Isthmus of Tehuantepec, along the Gulf of Mexico, and into Louisiana.

Geography

Physical

Mountains 
A broad arching fold belt of 'morphological distinct mountain ranges separated by deep fault-controlled canyons and occasional broad alluvial valleys' extends along the south-southeasterly limit of the Block. The most prominent of said mountain ranges are the Northern Chiapas Mountains and the Sierra Madre de Chiapas in Mexico, the Cuchumatanes, Chama, Santa Cruz, and Lacandon Ranges in Guatemala, and the Maya Mountains in Belize.

Karstlands 
The 'most extensive karstlands of the North American continent' extend northwards from the Block's southern extreme. The Block's most prominent karstic landform is the Yucatan Platform to its north. Relatively less prominent karstic formations occur in the Block's southern portion, including an unnamed formation in northwestern Petennortheastern Belize, the Belize Barrier Reef, the Lacandon Range, the Cuchumatanes Range, and various formations to the north and south of the Maya Mountains.

Coasts 
The most prominent topographic features of the Block's Caribbean coast are extensive seagrass beds and coral reefs, with the Belize Barrier Reef forming a notable example of the latter. Its Pacific coast, in contrast, is predominated by extensive mangrove forests.

Human 
The terrestrial portion of the Block encompasses all six districts of Belize, five northerly departments of Guatemala (ie Huehuetenango, Quiche, Alta Verapaz, Izabal, Peten), and five southeasterly states of Mexico (ie Chiapas, Tabasco, Campeche, Yucatan, and Quintana Roo). Its submarine portion encompasses the continental shelf which abuts the coastal districts.

Geology

Stratigraphy

Crust 
The crust's ie Block's crystalline basement is composed mainly of SilurianTriassic metamorphic and igneous rocks, and is exposed in at least five formations, ie the Mixtequita Massif, Chiapas Massif, Cuchumatanes Dome, TucuruTeleman, and the Maya Mountains. Elsewhere, the basement is overlain by a thick sedimentary cover of Upper Palaeozoic clasts and carbonates, Upper Jurassic continental redbeds, and Cretaceous–Eocene carbonates and evaporites.

Morphology

Provinces 

The Block is thought to fully or partially incorporate between two and thirteen geologic provinces.

Basins 
The Block is believed to fully or partially comprehend some four or five sedimentary basins.

Faults 
A number of faults or fault zones have been identified within the Block, the most prominent of which include various boundary faults abutting the Maya Mountains, various offshore faults east of the Yucatan PeninsulaBelize, the Ticul Fault, the Malpaso Faults, and the Rio Hondo Faults.

Tectonics 
The Block is thought to experience significant counterclockwise rotation and a north-northwest down tilt, which gradually lowers the northern portion of the Yucatan Platform, thereby lifting its southern extreme in the Maya Mountains. Central America, including the southern portion of the Maya Block, 'is very well-known and characterised by numerous, medium size earthquakes preceded and followed by damaging shocks,' with the Middle America Trench in the Pacific deemed the main source of such quakes. Of thirty-three earthquakes of Ms ≥ 7.0 in Central America during 19001993, the epicentres of at least two of these were located within the Block (in its southwestern quadrant), though a further nine were located near it (in the MotaguaPolochic Faults or the portion of the Middle America Trench bordering the Block).

History

Pre-Cenozoic 
Middle America, including the Maya Block, is thought to have taken shape sometime after 170 million years ago. Its formation is thought to have 'involved [the] complex movement of [various] crustal blocks and terrains between the two pre-existing continental masses [ie North and South America].' Details of the pre-Cenozoic portion of this process (ie 17067 million years ago), however, are not widely agreed upon. Nonetheless, it has been proposed that the Block formed before or during the opening of the Iapetus Ocean. It, together with the Oaxaquia, Suwannee, and Carolina Blocks, are thought to have constituted a peri-Gondwanan terrane on that continent's western, northwestern, or eastern edge during the AppalachianCaledonian or OuachitaMarathonAppalachian orogeny (ie during the formation of Pangaea from the collision of Gondwana and Laurentia). It is thought to have been displaced away from the Laurentian craton by clockwise rotation, translation, or anticlockwise rotation, during the Middle Jurassic opening of the Gulf of Mexico and subsequent northwesterly drift of North America away from Pangaea.

Cenozoic 
Details of the Cenozoic (ie 660 million years ago) geologic history of Middle America, including that of the Maya Block, are relatively more widely agreed upon. In broad strokes, the Chortis Block is thought to have reached its present-day position by at least 20 million years ago. The northern and eastern coasts of the Block are not thought to have been fully subaerially exposed until some 52 million years ago. The Block's coastlines, which were initially more expansive than its present-day ones, are thought to have reached modern dimensions due to rising sea levels some 118 thousand years ago.

Timeline

Scholarship 
The Block was discovered in 1969 by Gabriel Dengo, a Guatemalan geographer. It was quickly adopted in scholarship, and remains 'accepted by many as a valid subdivision of Central America's geology, especially of its crystalline basement.'

Notes and references

Explanatory footnotes

Short citations

Full citations

Journals

Print

Theses

Maps

Other 
 
 

Geology of North America
Geology of the Atlantic Ocean
Geology of Belize
Geology of Guatemala
Geology of Mexico
Geomorphology#Physiographic divisions
Physiographic divisions